V. Suárez Group is one of Puerto Rico's largest commercial groups. Founded in 1943 the organization has grown and diversified.

Subsidiaries
Today V. Suárez Group is diversified into three distinct businesses:

 V. Suárez Division - The leading consumer product distribution entity in Puerto Rico with special interests in beverage and provision distribution. Additionally the division runs "El Horreo", a consumer retail wine store. 
 V.Suárez Investment Co. - A diversified investment management company focused on maximizing investment income through a variety of investment instruments both within and outside of Puerto Rico.
 V.Suárez Real Estate Group - A real estate development and management company focused principally on the warehouse and office segments of the market.

Each of these three operating entities is supported by a centralized corporate services group composed of Executive Management, MIS, Finance & Accounting and Human Resources. The corporate services group ensures that managerial systems and processes are in place, and that adequate resources are allocated against business/market opportunities to ensure success and build stakeholder value.

References

External links
Official Site

Companies of Puerto Rico
Conglomerate companies established in 1943
Puerto Rican brands
1943 establishments in Puerto Rico